Harri Heliövaara and Henri Laaksonen were the defending champions but chose not to defend their title.

Mitchell Krueger and Blaž Rola won the title after defeating Sekou Bangoura and Blaž Kavčič 6–4, 6–1 in the final.

Seeds

Draw

References

External links
 Main draw

Charlottesville Men's Pro Challenger - Doubles
2019 Doubles